Peer review is the evaluation of work by one or more people with similar competencies as the producers of the work (peers). It functions as a form of self-regulation by qualified members of a profession within the relevant field. Peer review methods are used to maintain quality standards, improve performance, and provide credibility. In academia, scholarly peer review is often used to determine an academic paper's suitability for publication. Peer review can be categorized by the type of activity and by the field or profession in which the activity occurs, e.g., medical peer review. It can also be used as a teaching tool to help students improve writing assignments.

Henry Oldenburg (1619–1677) was a German-born British philosopher who is seen as the 'father' of modern scientific peer review.

Professional 
Professional peer review focuses on the performance of professionals, with a view to improving quality, upholding standards, or providing certification. In academia, peer review is used to inform decisions related to faculty advancement and tenure.

A prototype professional peer review process was recommended in the Ethics of the Physician written by Ishāq ibn ʻAlī al-Ruhāwī (854–931). He stated that a visiting physician had to make duplicate notes of a patient's condition on every visit. When the patient was cured or had died, the notes of the physician were examined by a local medical council of other physicians, who would decide whether the treatment had met the required standards of medical care.

Professional peer review is common in the field of health care, where it is usually called clinical peer review. Further, since peer review activity is commonly segmented by clinical discipline, there is also physician peer review, nursing peer review, dentistry peer review, etc. Many other professional fields have some level of peer review process: accounting, law, engineering (e.g., software peer review, technical peer review), aviation, and even forest fire management.

Peer review is used in education to achieve certain learning objectives, particularly as a tool to reach higher order processes in the affective and cognitive domains as defined by Bloom's taxonomy. This may take a variety of forms, including closely mimicking the scholarly peer review processes used in science and medicine.

Scholarly

Government policy

The European Union has been using peer review in the "Open Method of Co-ordination" of policies in the fields of active labour market policy since 1999. In 2004, a program of peer reviews started in social inclusion. Each program sponsors about eight peer review meetings in each year, in which a "host country" lays a given policy or initiative open to examination by half a dozen other countries and the relevant European-level NGOs. These usually meet over two days and include visits to local sites where the policy can be seen in operation. The meeting is preceded by the compilation of an expert report on which participating "peer countries" submit comments. The results are published on the web.

The United Nations Economic Commission for Europe, through UNECE Environmental Performance Reviews, uses peer review, referred to as "peer learning", to evaluate progress made by its member countries in improving their environmental policies.

The State of California is the only U.S. state to mandate scientific peer review. In 1997, the Governor of California signed into law Senate Bill 1320 (Sher), Chapter 295, statutes of 1997, which mandates that, before any CalEPA Board, Department, or Office adopts a final version of a rule-making, the scientific findings, conclusions, and assumptions on which the proposed rule are based must be submitted for independent external scientific peer review. This requirement is incorporated into the California Health and Safety Code Section 57004.

Medical

Medical peer review may be distinguished in four classifications:
 Clinical peer review is a procedure for assessing a patient's involvement with experiences of care. It is a piece of progressing proficient practice assessment and centered proficient practice assessment—significant supporters of supplier credentialing and privileging.
 Peer evaluation of clinical teaching skills for both physicians and nurses.
 Scientific peer review of journal articles.
 A secondary round of peer review for the clinical value of articles concurrently published in medical journals.

Additionally, "medical peer review" has been used by the American Medical Association to refer not only to the process of improving quality and safety in health care organizations, but also to the process of rating clinical behavior or compliance with professional society membership standards. The clinical network believes it to be the most ideal method of guaranteeing that distributed exploration is dependable and that any clinical medicines that it advocates are protected and viable for individuals. Thus, the terminology has poor standardization and specificity, particularly as a database search term.

Technical

In engineering, technical peer review is a type of engineering review. Technical peer reviews are a well defined review process for finding and fixing defects, conducted by a team of peers with assigned roles. Technical peer reviews are carried out by peers representing areas of life cycle affected by material being reviewed (usually limited to 6 or fewer people). Technical peer reviews are held within development phases, between milestone reviews, on completed products or completed portions of products.

Pedagogical tool 
Peer review, or student peer assessment, is widely used in secondary and post-secondary education as part of the writing process. This collaborative learning tool involves groups of students reviewing each other's work and providing feedback and suggestions for revision. While widely used in English and composition classrooms, peer review has gained popularity in other disciplines which require writing as part of the curriculum. These other disciplines include those in the social and natural sciences. Peer review in classrooms helps students become more invested in their work, and the classroom environment at large. Understanding how their work is read by a diverse readership before it is graded by the teacher may also help students clarify ideas, and understand how to persuasively reach different audience members via their writing. It also gives students professional experience that they might draw on later when asked to review the work of a colleague prior to publication.

Critics of peer review in classrooms say that it can be ineffective due to students' lack of practice giving constructive criticism, or lack of expertise in the writing craft at large. As a response to these concerns, instructors may provide examples, model peer review with the class, or focus on specific areas of feedback during the peer review process. Instructors may also experiment with in-class peer review vs. peer review as homework, or peer review using technologies afforded by learning management systems online.

See also
 Objectivity (philosophy)
 Academic publishing
 Scientific literature
 Peer critique

References

Further reading

External links

 Monument to peer review, Moscow
What is Peer review? at Elsevier

 
Broad-concept articles